Hard Time on Planet Earth is an American science fiction television series that aired on CBS as a midseason replacement from March 1 to June 21, 1989. Airing for 13 episodes, the series starred Martin Kove and was created by Jim and John Thomas. Scheduled opposite NBC's Unsolved Mysteries and ABC's Growing Pains on Wednesdays, Hard Time on Planet Earth ranked 65th out of 81 programs upon its premiere. Ratings for the series never improved and the series was canceled by CBS in May 1989.

Synopsis
The main character was an alien Elite Military Officer (Kove) who served in a huge interplanetary war. After the war ended, he was prosecuted for a rebellion against the planet's ruling Council; he was found guilty, but in recognition of his valuable services in the war, he was given the chance to reform by spending an undetermined amount of time in a vastly underpowered human form on planet Earth. 

Along with him was dispatched Control (voiced by Danny Mann), a small floating robot in the form of a mechanical eye with the mission of overseeing Jesse (the earthly name adopted by the alien warrior, from the name tag on the first Earth clothes he wore) to make sure Jesse kept his violent behavior in check. Control also provided comic relief to the series, usually by assessing the events with the catchphrase "Negative outcome. Not good." 

Each episode followed Jesse as he reluctantly helped different people in need. He derives much of his information from television shows, giving him a skewed sense of Earth culture. At first, Jesse only helped those in need to earn Control's approval in order to put an end to his exile, but he slowly became fond of the goodness he encountered from some of Earth's people.

Reception
Most critics detested the series. According to People magazine, "About 20,000 RPM—that's how fast I reckon Walt Disney must be spinning in his grave with shows like this on the air … It is just one long, bad commercial."

Episodes

References

External links
 
 

1989 American television series debuts
1989 American television series endings
1980s American science fiction television series
CBS original programming
English-language television shows
Television series by ABC Studios
Television series created by Jim Thomas (screenwriter)
Television series created by John Thomas (screenwriter)
Television series about alien visitations
Television shows set in Los Angeles